Cyril Montague Pennington-Richards (17 December 1911 – 2 January 2005) was a British film director and cinematographer.

Selected filmography
Cinematographer
 Theirs Is the Glory (1946)
 All Over the Town (1949)
 Obsession (1949)
 Give Us This Day (1949)
 The Wooden Horse (1950)
 White Corridors (1951)
 Scrooge (1951)
 Something Money Can't Buy (1952)
 Always a Bride (1953)
 Forbidden Cargo (1954)
 1984 (1956)
 It's Never Too Late (1956)
 Tarzan and the Lost Safari (1957)

Director
 The Oracle (1953)
 Hour of Decision (1957)
 Stormy Crossing (1958)
 Inn for Trouble (1960)
 Double Bunk (1961)
 Dentist on the Job (1961)
 Ladies Who Do (1963)
 Mystery Submarine (1963)
 A Challenge for Robin Hood (1967)
 Danny the Dragon (1967)
 Sky Pirates (1977)

References

External links
 
 Obituary in The Stage

1911 births
2005 deaths
British film directors
British cinematographers
People from South Norwood
Place of birth missing
Place of death missing